Maurice Michael Otunga (January 1923 – 6 September 2003) was a Kenyan Catholic prelate and cardinal who served as the Archbishop of Nairobi from 1971 until his resignation in 1997. Pope Paul VI elevated him into the cardinalate in 1973 as the Cardinal-Priest of San Gregorio Barbarigo alle Tre Fontane. Otunga was the son of a tribal chief and denied taking his father's place so as to pursue a path to the priesthood after completing his studies at home and in Rome. He was made a bishop in the 1950s and then transferred to a new diocese at its head; he later was transferred to Nairobi and was a participant in the Second Vatican Council.

Otunga was known for his vehement opposition to the use of condoms and twice in the 1990s burnt boxes of condoms before the faithful. He explained that contraception was in breach of Christian teaching and that it was in opposition to Humanae Vitae issued in 1968. He was also a vocal critic of abortion and was critical of priests who involved themselves in social and political controversies.

His cause of canonization has commenced and he has been titled as a Servant of God.

Life

Childhood and conversion
Maurice Michael Otunga was born in 1923 to Wasike Lusweti Sudi (a pagan and chieftain of the Bakhome (or Bukusu) tribe) and Rosa Namisi.

His father had about 70 wives and children with each and taught Otunga the basic tenets of their traditional religion. He was given the name "Otunga" which meant a staff the old lean on for support. But his original name was "Odunga" but changed to "Otunga" since the Lubukusu language had no "D" sound to it. But this was his second name: his father had called him this because he felt it was better than the name his mother had chosen for him. Rosa named her infant son "Simiyu" upon his birth. His half-brother was Peter Nabangi. He converted to Catholicism and was baptized in 1935 (from Fr. Leo Pulaert) where he was given the name "Maurice Michael". His father was later baptized in 1963 and his mother also later in 1965. Otunga received his Confirmation on 29 September 1939 from Bishop Joseph Shanahan.

Education and priesthood
He studied at Mill High School in Kibabii from 1931 to 1933 and later at another school in Sijei from 1933 to 1934. He finished his studies at Mang'u High School in Kabaa from 1934 to 1935 before obtaining a licentiate in his theological studies in September 1951. He began his ecclesial studies in Kakamega where he began both his philosophical and theological studies which he finished at the Gaba ecclesial school in Kampala in Uganda. He refused to become his tribe's chieftain after his father resigned from the position in 1947.

He transferred to Rome and was a student at the Pontifical Urban from 1947 until 1950. It was there in Rome that he was ordained to the priesthood on 3 October 1950. He also obtained his theological doctorate in Rome after finishing his further studies which spanned from 1950 to 1951. He travelled in Europe for several months in 1951 and visited northern Italian cities before going to Paris and Lourdes in France and then to England and Ireland.

Upon his return to his homeland he served in the theological department as a professor from 1951 until 1954 at the ecclesial school in Kisumu while he also served as the vice-chancellor of the diocesan curia. He served also as the private aide to James Robert Knox from 1954 until his appointment to the episcopate in 1956. In 1956 he was assigned to serve as a pastor at the Makupa parish in Nairobi.

Episcopate
The decisive moment in his priesthood came after Pope Pius XII nominated him to the episcopate; he was made the Titular Bishop of Tacape and received his episcopal consecration from Knox a couple of months later in Kakamega. Pope John XXIII later transferred Otunga to the new Diocese of Kisii. Otunga attended the four sessions of the Second Vatican Council (1962-1965) and was promoted as the Titular Archbishop of Bomarza in 1969. Later on 15 November 1969 another decisive moment came when Pope Paul VI nominated him as the Coadjutor Bishop of Nairobi. This meant that he would succeed the current archbishop as its head upon his resignation. He succeeded as the Archbishop of Nairobi on 24 October 1971.

He served as the vice-president of the Association of Member Episcopal Conferences in Eastern Africa (AMECEA) and a member of the permanent committee of the Episcopal Conferences of Africa and Madagascar (SECAM). He also participated in various episcopal assemblies that the pope convoked in Rome.

Cardinalate
On 5 March 1973 he was created and proclaimed a cardinal as the Cardinal-Priest of San Gregorio Barbarigo alle Tre Fontane. He attended the two episcopal assembles the pope called in Rome both in 1974 and 1977. He also participated in the papal conclave of August 1978 and the conclave of October 1978 that saw the elections of Pope John Paul I and Pope John Paul II. Otunga also participated in other episcopal assembles in Rome both in 1980 and 1994.

In 1994 in Rome he stated to the world's bishops:

Otunga lived in modest conditions and eschewed much of the trappings that came with the episcopal office; he even drove in his own Peugeot 304. He often visited President Daniel Arap Moi to urge him to implement democratic reforms and disapproved of priests becoming involved in social or political controversies. He sought to promote and encourage diocesan vocations and he invited religious congregations to settle and work in Nairobi.

He served on various departments in the Roman Curia as is the norm for a cardinal. Those appointments were:
 Congregation for Divine Worship and the Discipline of the Sacraments
 Congregation for Religious and Secular Institutes

Resignation and death
In 1991 he fell ill and failed to secure his resignation from Pope John Paul II. The pope instead decided to appoint a coadjutor bishop who would have the right of succession in case Otunga either died or otherwise. In 1992 he suffered a stroke and sent a second resignation letter which was accepted in 1997; after he retired he moved into an aged care home and lost his power to vote in papal conclaves after he had turned 80.

Otunga died on 6 September 2003 at 6:45am of cardiac arrest in the intensive care unit of the Mater Misericordiae Hospital in Nairobi. Otunga had been hospitalized there for about two months. The funeral was celebrated on 19 September in Nairobi. His remains were interred in Nairobi at Saint Austin's in Msongari which was a traditional burial ground for priests or deacons. He was the highest in rank to be interred there. His remains were later transferred to the Karen's Resurrection Gardens on 24 August 2005 at 1:00pm. His remains were relocated in secret after his old Bukusu tribe argued the move would bring about a curse.

Street
In late 2016 the government named a street in Nairobi in his honor: "Cardinal Otunga Road".

Beatification process
In 2005 plans were announced to consider and launch the cause for the late cardinal's beatification; national bishops made their "ad limina apostolorum" visit to Rome in November 2007 and sought advice on the matter from the Congregation for the Causes of Saints. The formal petition to the cause was made to Cardinal John Njue on 30 October 2009 and Njue wrote on 6 November to the Congregation for the Causes of Saints requesting their approval to initiate the cause. The latter voiced their assent declaring "nihil obstat" (no objections) on 1 March 2010 and titled Otunga as a Servant of God. Njue announced the cause would open on 6 August 2010 but did not set the date for its opening at that point.

The diocesan process opened in Nairobi on 11 November 2011 and spoke to 171 witnesses in total while collecting 23, 995 pages of documentation regarding the cardinal's life and works. This diocesan investigation closed on 28 September 2013. The documents were sealed in boxes and handed over to the papal nuncio Charles Daniel Balvo for transferral to the C.C.S. in Rome. The C.C.S. validated this process on 9 May 2014.

The first postulator for this cause died on 12 August 2012. The current postulator is Dr. Waldery Hilgeman (since 1 September 2012).

Views

Condoms
On 31 August 1996 (before 250 faithful) he burned condoms in Uhuru Park as part of his campaigning against the use of condoms. He deemed them to be against the teachings of the Church and more so an affront to Humanae Vitae which Pope Paul VI had issued in 1968. Otunga urged people to exercise abstinence instead and affirmed that contraception did not solve the HIV/AIDS crisis. He also met with local Islamic leaders for ceremonial bonfires to burn condoms in public. One such public bonfire was on 19 August 1995 in which he joined the Imam of Nairobi's Jamia Mosque Sheikh Ali Shee in burning condoms and sex education literature.

Family planning
Otunga criticized family planning activists and sought to have them desist from interfering with family life. He criticized them in the following words:

Abortion
Otunga was a strong critic of abortion and said that human life remained sacred from the moment of conception until natural death.

Education
Otunga supported President Moi's reforms in ending the sexual education curriculum in schools.

Islam
Amin al-Hinawi (on 14 January 1993) issued a sharp criticism that Otunga made regarding warnings against the expansion of Islam in Africa. The Church clarified that the cardinal was misinterpreted and had been speaking out against "Islamic fundamentalism" which he perceived to be on the rise rather than the Islamic religion itself. Otunga had once made an assertion that Muhammad as the last prophet was based on a lie since Jesus Christ was the last prophet. These remarks caused considerable debate and incense among Muslims.

The assistant minister Sharif Nassir on 7 January 1987 requested Otunga to read and understand the Quran to better work for interreligious dialogue.

References

External links
 Hagiography Circle
 Official site
 DCAB
 Santi e Beati
 Catholic Hierarchy

1923 births
2003 deaths
20th-century cardinals
20th-century Roman Catholic archbishops in Kenya
21st-century cardinals
21st-century venerated Christians
Alumni of Mang'u High School
Anti-contraception activists
Bishops appointed by Pope Pius XII
Cardinals created by Pope Paul VI
Kenyan anti-abortion activists
Kenyan cardinals
Roman Catholic archbishops of Nairobi
People from Bungoma County
Participants in the Second Vatican Council
Pontifical Urban University alumni
Servants of God
Roman Catholic bishops of Kisumu
Roman Catholic bishops of Kisii
Kenyan expatriates in Uganda
Kenyan expatriates in Italy